Child nutrition in India is a serious problem for the public administration. However India is on course to meet select child nutrition targets such as the target for stunting. In 2019, according to UNICEF report, malnutrition is the cause of 69% of deaths among children below 5 years in India.

Rank 
This is a list of states and union territories of India ranked by the percentage of underweight and overweight children, by the status of effective coverage of supplementary nutrition program for children, and by percentage of children living in households using iodized salt.

The figures come from the 2011 Evaluation Report on Integrated Child Development Services (ICDS) published by Planning Commission, Government of India and National Family Health Survey 4 and 5.

See also 

 Obesity in India
 Malnutrition in India
 India State Hunger Index
 Health in India

References

External links 

 NITI Aayog nutrition dashboard

Child nutrition
Lists of subdivisions of India
India,Child nutrition